James Sharp may refer to:

James Sharp (bishop) (1613–1679), Archbishop of St Andrews
James Sharp (mayor) (1843–1904), mayor of Salt Lake City, Utah
James A. Sharp Jr., mayor of Flint, Michigan
James E. Sharp (born 1940), lawyer
James Sharp (footballer, born 1870) (1870–?), Scottish footballer
James Sharp (footballer, born 1894) (1894–1915), Scottish footballer
James Sharp (footballer, born 1976), English footballer

See also
James Shairp (died 1796), British Marines officer
Jimmy Sharp (1880–1949), Scottish footballer
Jim Sharp (disambiguation)
James Sharpe (disambiguation)